Caravaggio is a town and comune in the province of Bergamo, in Lombardy, Italy,  east of Milan.

History
The town received the honorary title of city with a presidential decree on December 22, 1954.

Geography
Caravaggio borders with the municipalities of Bariano, Brignano Gera d'Adda, Calvenzano, Capralba (CR), Fornovo San Giovanni, Misano di Gera d'Adda, Morengo, Mozzanica, Sergnano (CR) and Treviglio. Its frazioni are Masano and Vidalengo.

Main sights
The city is best known for the Sanctuary (15th century).

Other sights include:
The Gallavresi Palace (or the Marchioness Palace), now the Town Hall. It dates to the second half of the 13th century.
Church of San Fermo e Rustico, in Lombard-Gothic style, built in the 13th century over a pre-existing holy edifice. The two aisles were added in 1429. It has a façade in brickwork with a marble central portal, surmounted by a large rose window. The interior houses the Holy Sacrament Chapel (late 15th-early 16th century), in Bramantesque style, variously attributed to Giovanni Battagio; also present are works by Bernardino Campi, Giovanni Moriggia, Giulio Cesare Procaccini and Nicola Moietta.
Church of Santa Liberata (16th century), with frescoes.
Porta Nuova arch (18th century)
Teatro Amerighi, named after the family of the painter Michelangelo Amerighi da Caravaggio, it was a theatre designed by the Liberty style architect Carlo Bedolini and built at the beginning of the 20th century. It has been probably the most important cultural and social spot of the city for decades before being destroyed at the end of the Second World War. In the area it was considered like a little Teatro alla Scala.

People
Giovanni Francesco Straparola, Renaissance writer and poet.
Giovanni Mangone, 16th century architect and sculptor.
Michelangelo Merisi o Amerighi da Caravaggio, Italian Baroque painter, who is named after the town.
Polidoro da Caravaggio, Renaissance artist
Riccardo Montolivo, footballer

Transportation 
Caravaggio has a railway station on the Treviglio–Cremona line.

Twin towns
 Porto Ercole (Tuscany, Italy; since 1973)
 Valletta (Malta; since 2010)

References

External links

 Caravaggio official website